Stefano Chuka Okaka (born 9 August 1989) is an Italian footballer who plays as a forward for Süper Lig club Istanbul Basaksehir.

He began his career at Roma, debuting shortly after his 16th birthday and being loaned to several other teams for the duration of his contract. He totalled over 125 Serie A games for that club, Bari, Parma, Sampdoria and Udinese. Abroad, he played 47 Premier League matches for Fulham and Watford, and had a season in Belgium with Anderlecht.

Club career

Roma
Born in Castiglione del Lago, Umbria, Italy to Nigerian parents who later obtained Italian citizenship, Okaka joined the Roma youth system in 2004. He was part of the team that won the U-20 national title in 2005 and scored goals against Juventus in the semi-final and Atalanta in the final.

On 29 September 2005, at the age of  he made his debut with the first team in the UEFA Cup, playing against Aris. He thus became the youngest footballer to debut in an international competition for an Italian team. He made his Serie A debut with the club later that month, on 18 December, at the age of 16 years and 125 days, in a 1–1 away draw against Sampdoria. 

Okaka scored his first Serie A goal on 17 September 2006, concluding a 3–1 win over Siena, just 38 days after his 17th birthday, after coming on as a substitute for Francesco Totti. He made his debut in the UEFA Champions League ten days later, in a 2–1 away loss to Valencia, aged .

Okaka was subsequently loaned to Serie B side Modena for the 2007–08 season in order to gain some first team experience. He scored seven times in 33 appearances. After returning to Roma, he signed a new contract which lasted until 30 June 2012. As a part of it, he earned a gross annual salary of €600,000 in the first two seasons, which then increased to €700,000 and €900,000. He also spent a six-month loan period at Brescia in Serie B from January to June 2009, where he scored two goals in 16 appearances.

On 6 August 2009, substitute Okaka scored his first goal with Roma in a continental competition, the final goal in a 7–1 win away to Gent in the second leg of the 2009–10 UEFA Europa League third qualifying round (10–2 aggregate). He scored again in the Europa League in Roma's 2–0 win over CSKA Sofia and in Roma's 2–1 win over Fulham. His last goal with Roma was an 88th-minute winner against Siena.

On 1 February 2010, he joined Fulham on loan until the end of the season. He made his debut in the 1–0 win over Portsmouth on 3 February, and scored his first goal for the club eleven days later in a 5th round FA Cup tie at home to Notts County. He scored his first league goal for the club against Wigan Athletic on 4 April, in a 2–1 win at Craven Cottage. He was cup-tied for Fulham's run to the 2010 UEFA Europa League Final.

In January 2011 Okaka moved to Bari on loan. There, he scored his first goal against Lecce for 1–0 win. In this game he and Kamil Glik marking their debuts for Bari. He scored one further goal for Bari that season. Okaka sustained an injury in round 30 and missed the rest of the season.

In August 2011, Okaka was attacked by Roma fans after a training session for allegedly not wishing to sign autographs.

Parma
After failing to make a single appearance for Roma in the first half of the season, on 22 January 2012, Okaka joined Parma on loan until the end of the season. He scored his first goal on 7 March, the opener in a 2–2 against Fiorentina.

Okaka signed a permanent deal with Parma on 20 August 2012. The following day he was loaned to the newly promoted Serie B club Spezia where he made 38 appearances, scoring seven goals and assisting six more. After his loan spell, he returned to Parma for the 2013–14 season, making only two Serie A matches as a substitute.

Sampdoria
On 31 January 2014, Okaka was transferred to the fellow Serie A outfit Sampdoria on a permanent deal, with Nicola Pozzi moving the opposite direction. He made a good start to his Sampdoria career, scoring five times in 13 appearances in the 2013–14 season.

He scored his first goal of the 2014–15 season on 14 September 2014, a solo effort, in the 2–0 victory against Torino on 14 September 2014. On 10 June 2015, the owner and president of Sampdoria Massimo Ferrero told the Italian media that Okaka would be leaving the club.

Anderlecht
On 28 July 2015, Okaka joined Belgian side Anderlecht from Sampdoria for a reported fee of €3 million.

Watford / Udinese
On 29 August 2016, Okaka joined Watford from Anderlecht on a five-year contract.
He scored his first two goals on 10 December, against Everton in a 3–2 win. In his second season, after the departure of compatriot manager Walter Mazzarri, he was more used as a substitute; his one goal came on opening day, opening a 3–3 draw with Liverpool at Vicarage Road.

On 8 January 2019, Okaka was loaned to Udinese for the rest of the Serie A season, having played just 47 minutes for Watford all season across three substitute appearances. Both clubs were owned by Giampaolo Pozzo. He scored six goals in 16 games as the Bianconeri avoided relegation, including braces in consecutive wins over Frosinone and SPAL in May.

Okaka's move to Udinese was made permanent on 2 September 2019, on a three-year contract.

International career
After gaining Italian citizenship in 2007, Okaka was selected for the Italian Under-19 side. He made his debut for the Italy U-20 team in 2008, scoring two goals. On 17 November 2009, he made his debut with the Italy U-21 squad in a match against Luxembourg.

In April 2014, Okaka revealed he was in talks with the Nigeria Football Federation about the possibility of him switching allegiance to his parents' country and play with the Nigeria national football team already at the 2014 FIFA World Cup.

However, Okaka was included in the Italy squad for their friendly against Albania on 18 November 2014 by manager Antonio Conte. He made his debut as a substitute, replacing Sebastian Giovinco in the second half, and scored the only goal of the match in the victory at Sampdoria's home ground, the Stadio Luigi Ferraris.

Personal life
Okaka's twin sister, Stefania Okaka, is also a professional sportsperson. A volleyball player, she plays for Béziers Volley of the French first division and the Italian national team.

Career statistics

Club

International

Scores and results list Italy's goal tally first.

References

External links

 
 
 
 AIC Profile 
 FIGC Profile 

1989 births
Living people
People from Castiglione del Lago
Sportspeople from the Province of Perugia
Footballers from Umbria
Italian footballers
Association football forwards
S.S.C. Bari players
A.S. Roma players
Modena F.C. players
Brescia Calcio players
A.S. Cittadella players
Fulham F.C. players
Parma Calcio 1913 players
Spezia Calcio players
U.C. Sampdoria players
R.S.C. Anderlecht players
Watford F.C. players
Udinese Calcio players
İstanbul Başakşehir F.K. players
Serie A players
Serie B players
Premier League players
Belgian Pro League players
Süper Lig players
Expatriate footballers in England
Expatriate footballers in Belgium
Expatriate footballers in Turkey
Italian expatriate sportspeople in England
Italian expatriate sportspeople in Belgium
Italian expatriate sportspeople in Turkey
Italian expatriate footballers
Italy youth international footballers
Italy under-21 international footballers
Italy international footballers
Italian people of Nigerian descent
Italian sportspeople of African descent
Italian twins
Twin sportspeople
Naturalised citizens of Italy